Rede is a village and civil parish in the West Suffolk district of Suffolk in eastern England. Its location is situated South East of Chedburgh. In 1887 Rede was described as being 
"7 miles S[outh] W[est] of Bury St Edmonds, 1224 ac[res], pop[ulation] 224".

Its population in 2011 was 131 residents according to the Census taken in that year.

The institutional history of Rede explains that it has always been a place of housing for agricultural workers, craftsmen and the lower class in general. It is thought that the name "Rede" originates from a mercer from London, William Rede who was granted the manor and advowson of nearby medieval site of Beccles.

References

External links

Villages in Suffolk
Civil parishes in Suffolk
Borough of St Edmundsbury